The UMass Minutemen basketball team represents the University of Massachusetts Amherst in Amherst, Massachusetts, in NCAA Division I men's college basketball. They play their home games in the William D. Mullins Memorial Center. The Minutemen currently compete in the Atlantic 10 Conference.

History

The men's basketball program has a history of over 100 years. The Minutemen, as they have been called since 1972, celebrated their 100th season in 2008–09. Though the program's first game was played on January 10, 1900, there were several years in which no team was assembled.

The program's first coach was Harold M. Gore, who in 11 seasons compiled a record of 85–53 (.616 win percentage), highlighted by a 12–2 season in 1925–26. In 1933–34, Massachusetts was the only undefeated team in men's college basketball, going 12–0. For the 1948–49 season, Massachusetts joined the Yankee Conference to mark the first time they participated in conference play. UMass would go on to be 10-time champions of the Yankee Conference.

The 1960s and 1970s were prosperous for the program. The 1961–62 team went 15–9 and participated in the NCAA tournament for the first time in program history. They would go on to win 4 Yankee Conference titles in the 1960s, and played in the NIT at the end of the 1969–70 season. Though not a nationally recognized name, the program's coach with the most wins was Jack Leaman.  Leaman guided Massachusetts to 217 wins, and coached players including Julius Erving, Al Skinner, Rick Pitino and Tom McLaughlin. The program compiled a record of 142–103 (.580) in the 1960s. The 1969–70 team featured Julius Erving. In his first game with the varsity team, a 90–85 win over Providence College, Erving scored 27 points and grabbed 28 rebounds.

In the first eight seasons of the 1970s, the Redmen/Minutemen compiled a record of 152–65 (.700).  They won 5 Yankee Conference titles, and played in 5 NITs (the Yankee Conference did not have an NCAA Tournament automatic bid). The early 1970s teams featured players such as Erving, Al Skinner, and Rick Pitino. Jack Leaman, who coached the team for 13 seasons, hung it up after the 1978–79 season, with a record of 217–126 (.632). Though Leaman's last season as coach of the men's team was 1978–79, he remained a key part of the UMass Athletic Department until he died in 2004.

John Calipari era 1988–1996
The Minutemen fell on hard times in the late 1970s and 1980s, but would rebound under the direction of rookie coach John Calipari, perhaps the school's most recognizable coach, who took the head coaching job in 1988. Calipari took over a program that was on a streak of 10-straight losing seasons and had not been to the NCAA Tournament since 1962. Calipari led UMass to the NIT in his second season as head coach. In his fourth season, UMass won the A-10 regular season and tournament championships. Over the next few seasons, Calipari took the team to new heights and frequent #1 rankings in the AP weekly poll. In 1996, the Minutemen reached the Final Four for the first time. After the 1995–96 season, Calipari left UMass for the NBA as the new head coach of the New Jersey Nets. The 1990s were the defining decade for UMass basketball.  Calipari helped the Minutemen become A-10 Tournament Champs five consecutive times (1992, 1993, 1994, 1995, 1996), and appeared in the NCAA Tournament seven times, including two appearances in the Elite Eight (1995, 1996) and a Final Four appearance (1996), the only appearance ever for the Minutemen. However, NCAA sanctions stripped the Minutemen of their 1996 NCAA Tournament victories. The sanctions, based on star Marcus Camby admitting he took money, clothes, and jewelry from an agent during the season, removed the Final Four from the record books. Additionally, 45% of tournament revenue had to be returned to the NCAA. Camby reimbursed the school for the $151,617 in lost revenue.

After Calipari resigned in 1996, his associate Bruiser Flint coached from 1996–2001, and Steve Lappas coached from 2001–2005.

Travis Ford era 2005–2008
In 2005, Travis Ford replaced Lappas. Though the Minutemen struggled with a 13–15 record in Ford's first season of 2005–06, he quickly improved the team in the next two seasons. In 2006–07, the Minutemen were co-champions of the Atlantic 10 (along with Xavier), reached the second round of the NIT, and finished with a record of 24–9. In 2007–08, the Minutemen reached the NIT championship game where they lost to Ohio State 92–85 and finished with a record of 25–11. Following the 2007–08 season, his third with the Minutemen, he left to take the head coaching vacancy at Oklahoma State.

Derek Kellogg era 2009–2017

On April 23, 2008, former Minutemen player Derek Kellogg returned to Amherst and became the 21st coach of the program. In 2011–12 the Minutemen appeared in the NIT after a successful season with a 22–11 record, reaching the semifinals, where they lost to Stanford.  The Minutemen were again invited to the NIT in following the 2012–13.

The 2013–14 season was a massive success, as the Minutemen qualified for the NCAA tournament for the first time in 16 years. The team started off the season 10–0 and then 16–1, while reaching as high as #13 in the AP poll, and #12 in the Coaches poll. However, the Minutemen, a #6 seed, were defeated in their first game against #11 seeded Tennessee.

In the 2014–15 season, the Minutemen again struggled, falling to 17–15 on the season. Struggles continued the following season as UMass finished 14–18.

Kellogg was fired on March 9, 2017.

Matt McCall era 2017–2022 
Shortly after Kellogg was fired, the school announced that Winthrop head coach Pat Kelsey had been hired as the new head coach at UMass. However, shortly before the press conference to announce his hiring, Kelsey announced he would not accept the position. On March 31, the school announced they had hired Chattanooga head coach Matt McCall. 

McCall's tenure was not particularly successful, finishing with a 60–81 overall record at the school before being fired at the end of the 2022 season.

Rivalries
Through 2009, Massachusetts and the Rhode Island Rams have played over 130 times and at least once a year every year since 1950.  The Atlantic 10 regularly pairs UMass and URI in a home-and-home series each season.

Starting in 1995, Massachusetts and Boston College played annually for the Commonwealth Cup, in the "Commonwealth Classic". Following the 2011–2012 season (in which UMass defeated the Eagles 82–46 in Chestnut Hill), Boston College discontinued the series in part due to changes to the ACC conference schedule and canceled their return trip to Amherst in late 2012.

UMass and Temple had an intense rivalry in the 1990s, during which time the schools were coached by John Calipari and John Chaney. The two coaches had to be restrained from each other during a 3-overtime game in 1990. After a game in 1994, Chaney charged at Calipari during a post-game press conference, and in front of reporters and television cameras, threatened to kill Calipari.

From 1996 to 2005, Massachusetts and Connecticut played in the "Mass Mutual U-Game", a reference to the two schools' nicknames, UMass and UConn, respectively. UConn won nine of the ten games.  UMass won the 2004 game, in which the Huskies were the defending national champions.

Season-by-season results

Source

Postseason results

NCAA tournament results
The Minutemen have appeared in the NCAA tournament nine times. Their combined record is 11–9. Their 1996 victories have been vacated by the NCAA thus their official tournament record is 7–8.

 vacated by NCAA

NIT results
The Minutemen have appeared in the National Invitation Tournament (NIT) 13 times. Their combined record is 13–14.

Prominent alumni

NBA players
Several Massachusetts alumni have gone on to play in the NBA:
Marcus Camby
Julius Erving
Gary Forbes
Tony Gaffney
Lari Ketner
Stephane Lasme
Lou Roe
Al Skinner

International league players

Raphiael Putney (born 1990), basketball player for Maccabi Haifa of the Israeli National League

Retired numbers

Five former players and one coach have had their names hung on banners in the rafters of the Mullins Center.

UMass Athletic Hall of Fame
Many former members of the basketball program have been elected into the school's Hall of Fame.  Class years listed in parentheses.

David Bartley (1956)
George "Trigger" Burke (1956)
Lou Bush (1934)
John Calipari (coach)
Marcus Camby (1996)
Joe DiSarcina (1969)
Ray Ellerbrook (1970)
Frederick "Fritz" Ellert (1930)
Julius Erving (1972)
Jack Foley (1957)
Harold "Kid" Gore (coach)
Emory Grayson (1917)
Doug Grutchfield (1961)
Ned Larkin (1959)
Jack Leaman (coach)
Joseph Lojko (1934)
Jim McCoy (1992)
Edward McGrath (1949)
Bill Prevey (1952)
Lou Roe (1995)
Al Skinner (1974)
John Stewart (1936)
Billy Tindall (1968)
Rodger Twitchell (1964)
Harper Williams (1993)

The Hall is officially named "The George 'Trigger' Burke UMass Athletic Hall of Fame" in recognition of Burke's generous support of UMass Athletics and student scholarships.

References

External links